Pembela Tanah Air Museum (PETA Museum) is museum in Bogor, Indonesia. The museum was established to provide a tribute to former soldiers (PETA) for their contributions in establishment the nation. In addition, the museum also gives an overview of Indonesia's independence struggle and preparation to fulfil its independence.

History
The original building housing the museum was built in 1745 by colonial army soldiers in a European (British) style. In 1943, the building was used as an army training centre (still under the control of Japan). Development of the PETA Museum began on 14 November 1993 with the laying of the first stone by the Vice President, Umar Wirahadikusumah. The development took approximately two years and was inaugurated by President Suharto on December 18, 1995.

See also
 List of museums and cultural institutions in Indonesia
 Pembela Tanah Air

References

Buildings and structures completed in 1745
1995 establishments in Indonesia
Museums established in 1995
History museums in Indonesia
World War II museums
Army museums in Asia
Museums in West Java
Pembela Tanah Air
Bogor